The Nagori is a Muslim community found in the state of Rajasthan in India.

History and origin 
The community claims to be Rajputs; some of them have converted to Islam others remain Hindu.
They were originally settled in the city of Nagaur, and Nagori literally means "an inhabitant of Nagaur". They speak Nagori among themselves. There are Hindu too with Nagori title who migrated from Nagaur district of Rajasthan to Didwana with the title Nagori with them, and today they are spread well throughout Jaipur, Bangalore, Delhi and Mumbai.

Present circumstances 
The community is found in the districts of Nagaur, Rajasthan.
The Nagoris are well known as marble tile manufacturers for the past 7 centuries and dairy farming for 4 decades. One of the biggest joint families in Nagaur belongs to Nagoris.

In Nagaur, Rajasthan they have their own caste council, the Nagori Jamat. Also in Pakistan they have their own caste council known as Nagori Jammat and their president is changed after two years. Like many Muslim castes in India and Pakistan, they follow their own Islamic laws for society. They have developed charity work to pension widows, old people, schools, and hospitals. Nagoris are well settled in India (Mumbai ,Gujarat and Delhi, Jaipur), Pakistan (Karachi, Hyderabad, Mirpurkhas, Umerkot, Tando Allahyar, Jhudo).

With the change in the era, they have turned towards other occupations like Doctors, Chartered Accountants, Government Officers and other jobs in MNCs, while many have moved to United Kingdom and United States of America. 

According to other views, the community's traditional occupation was that of blacksmithy, but as with other artisan groups, they have seen a decline of their traditional occupation.  They are involved in the manufacture of various iron objects such as knives and swords. Most of them have abandoned their traditional craft, the majority of the community are still engaged in work related to blacksmithy in Rajasthan. They have their own caste council, the Nagori Jamat. Like many Muslim artisan castes in India, they are strictly endogamous, and maintain the custom of gotra exogamy. Their main clans are the Chauhan, Behlim, 
Bhao Bidru and Kallaa(n) waale all which are of equal status, and intermarry. There are no reported cases of marriage with the Multani Lohar, a community which also involved in blacksmithing. The community is found in the districts of Ahmadabad, Mahesana and Banaskantha.

After partition from India in 1947, many people from nagori community migrated to Sindh province, Pakistan. currently nagoris are well establish in Karachi and associate with dairy farming business in cattle colony and milk shops around Karachi and contributing significant part in meeting milk demand of Karachi city and also supplying milk in other cities of pakistan.

See also 
 Gujarati Muslims
 Lohar
 Multani Lohar

References 

Muslim communities of India
Muslim communities of Gujarat
Social groups of Gujarat